The  is a limited express train service in Japan operated by Kyushu Railway Company (JR Kyushu) which runs between Beppu and Kumamoto, via .

Rolling stock
 KiHa 185 series DMU: 1992–present

History
The Trans-Kyushu Limited Express was introduced from 13 March 2004.

See also
 List of named passenger trains of Japan
 Joyful Train

References

Named passenger trains of Japan
Railway services introduced in 2004